Hiroshima Port Station is a Hiroden terminal station on Hiroden Ujina Line, located in Ujinakaigan 1-chome, Minami-ku, Hiroshima.

Routes
From Hiroshima Port Station, there are three of Hiroden Streetcar routes.

 Hiroshima Station - Hiroshima Port Route
 Hiroden-nishi-hiroshima - Hiroshima Port Route
 Hiroshima Station - (via Hijiyama-shita) - Hiroshima Port Route

Platforms
A for 

Connections
█ Ujina Line
 
Motoujina-guchi — Hiroshima Port

Other services connections
Ferries and hydrofoils for Matsuyama, Imabari, Kure, Miyajima, Etajima and some other islands in Seto Inland Sea.

Around station

Hiroshima Port
Hiroshima Minato Park

History
Opened as "Ujina" tram stop on April 1, 1951.
Rebuilt on October 1, 1967.
Renamed to "Hiroshima Port" on November 1, 2001.
Moved and Rebuilt on March 29, 2003 at the present place.

See also
Hiroden Streetcar Lines and Routes
List of railway stations in Japan

Hiroshima Port Station
Railway stations in Japan opened in 1951